Clarence Herbert "Steamboat" Struss (February 24, 1909 to September 12, 1985), was a Major League Baseball pitcher who played in  with the Pittsburgh Pirates. He batted and threw right-handed.  He got the start for the final game of Pittsburgh's 1934 season, and was tagged with the loss, giving up 6 runs (5 earned) in 7 innings.  At the plate, he was rather more successful, going 1-for-3, with his lone hit being a 2-RBI double.

He was born in Riverdale, Illinois and died in Grand Rapids, Michigan.

External links

1909 births
1985 deaths
Major League Baseball pitchers
Baseball players from Illinois
Pittsburgh Pirates players
People from Riverdale, Illinois